Hyon Hak-bong (or  ) is the former North Korean Ambassador to the United Kingdom. He was based at the Embassy of North Korea, London. In 2016, he was interviewed about North Korea's nuclear weapons policy. He is married to Choe Jin-ok. He is reported to have been an ally of the late Jang Song-thaek.

, Hyon is reported to have been recalled to North Korea following the defection of the former deputy ambassador Thae Yong-ho.

References 

Living people
Year of birth missing (living people)
Ambassadors of North Korea to the United Kingdom